The European Journal of Combinatorics is a closed-access peer-reviewed scientific journal for combinatorics. It is an international, bimonthly journal of discrete mathematics, specializing in theories arising from combinatorial problems. The journal is primarily open to papers dealing with mathematical structures within combinatorics and/or establishing direct links between combinatorics and the theories of computing. The journal includes full-length research papers, short notes, and research problems on several topics.
This journal has been founded by Michel Deza, Michel Las Vergnas and Pierre Rosenstiehl.
The current editor-in-chief is Patrice Ossona de Mendez and the vice editor-in-chief is Marthe Bonamy.

The impact factor for the European Journal of Combinatorics in 2020 was 0.847.

External links 
 European Journal of Combinatorics

References

Combinatorics journals
Elsevier academic journals
Publications established in 1980